Ken Chen (born 1979 San Diego, California) is an American poet and lawyer.

Early life
In 1979, Chen was born in San Diego, California. Chen's parents are immigrant from Taiwan. Chen grew up in the San Francisco Bay Area.

Education 
In 2001, Chen earned a BA degree in English literature from the University of California, Berkeley. In spring 2005 Chen earned a JD from Yale Law School.

Career
Chen was an editor of Arts & Letters Daily while at Berkeley and worked at Hughes Hubbard & Reed LLP after law school. He is currently director of the Asian American Writers' Workshop.

His writing has been published the Art Asia Pacific, Boston Review of Books, Manoa, Field, Pleiades, and Barrow Street, Bridge, Radical Society, 5 Fingers Review, and Palimpsest.

In 2004, Chen started his law career at Hughes, Hubbard & Reed, L.L.P in New York City, New York.

Personal life
Chen lives in Brooklyn, New York.

Awards
 2010 Yale Series of Younger Poets Competition

Works

References

External links
Author's website

1979 births
Lawyers from San Diego
American people of Taiwanese descent
UC Berkeley College of Letters and Science alumni
Yale Law School alumni
Living people
Writers from Brooklyn
Yale Younger Poets winners
American poets